Pjerin Noga (born 13 January 1963) is an Albanian retired footballer, who played the majority of his career as a defender for Dinamo Tirana.

International career
He made his debut for Albania in an April 1989 FIFA World Cup qualification match against England and earned a total of 3 caps, scoring no goals.

His final international was a May 1990 European Championship qualification match against Iceland.

Defection
Noga disappeared from the Dinamo Tirana squad in September 1990 at Marseille Airport after playing a European Champions Cup match against Olympique Marseille. At the time, Albania was still ruled by the communists. He later announced he would apply for political asylum in France. Noga was the first player not to return to Albania.

He later moved to the United States.

Honours
Albanian Superliga: 3
 1980, 1986, 1990

References

External links

1963 births
Living people
Association football defenders
Albanian footballers
Albania under-21 international footballers
Albania international footballers
FK Dinamo Tirana players
Connecticut Wolves players
Albanian expatriate footballers
Expatriate soccer players in the United States
Albanian expatriate sportspeople in the United States
Kategoria Superiore players
USL Second Division players
Albanian defectors